The 1997 Norwegian Football Cup was the 92nd edition of the Norwegian Football Cup. The 1997 Norwegian Football Cup  was won by the second-tier side Vålerenga, after they defeated Strømsgodset in the cup final with the score 4–2.

Calendar
Below are the dates for each round as given by the official schedule:

First round 

|colspan="3" style="background-color:#97DEFF"|20 May 1997

|-
|colspan="3" style="background-color:#97DEFF"|21 May 1997

|-
|colspan="3" style="background-color:#97DEFF"|22 May 1997

|}

Second round 

|colspan="3" style="background-color:#97DEFF"|10 June 1997

|-
|colspan="3" style="background-color:#97DEFF"|11 June 1997

|}

Third round 

|colspan="3" style="background-color:#97DEFF"|25 June 1997

|}

Fourth round

|colspan="3" style="background-color:#97DEFF"|9 July 1997

|-
|colspan="3" style="background-color:#97DEFF"|10 July 1997

|}

Quarter-finals

Semi-finals

First leg

Second leg 

Vålerenga won 5–2 on aggregate.

Strømsgodset won 4–3 on aggregate.

Final

References
http://www.rsssf.no

Norwegian Football Cup seasons
Norway
Football Cup